"Big Chips" is a 2004 song by R&B singer R. Kelly and rapper Jay-Z. It was also co-written by the song producers, Poke and Tone and Alexander Mosley. It was released in late 2004 as the lead single from Unfinished Business. It peaked at number 39 on the Billboard Hot 100 on November 13. It is a hip hop and a R&B song.

Track listing
CD Single
 Big Chips (Radio)
 Big Chips (Instrumental)
 Big Chips (Call-Out)

'Vinyl 12 '''
 A1 Big Chips (Radio)
 A2 Big Chips (LP)
 A3 Big Chips (Instrumental)
 B1 Don't Let Me Die (Radio)
 B2 Don't Let Me Die (LP)
 B3 Don't Let Me Die (Instrumental)

Charts

Weekly charts

Release history

References

External links
 [ Billboard.com] – Official song page on Billboard.com

2004 singles
2004 songs
Jay-Z songs
R. Kelly songs
Songs written by R. Kelly
Songs written by Samuel Barnes (songwriter)
Songs written by Jay-Z
Song recordings produced by Trackmasters
Def Jam Recordings singles